Industrial school may refer to:
Schools offering an industrial education in the United States such as Manual labor colleges
Industrial Schools in Ireland
Industrial Schools Act in England
List of industrial schools